The quauholōlli was a blunt weapon used by the Aztecs. It consisted of a wooden stick ending in a hard ball, ideal for breaking bones. This weapon is represented in the Lienzo de Tlaxcala, Codex Duran and the Florentine codex.

See also 

 Aztec warfare

References

Mesoamerican military equipment
Clubs (weapon)
Aztec warfare